According to the 2011 census, Slovaks in Serbia number 52,750, constituting 0.7% of the country's population. They mainly live in Vojvodina (50,321), where they constitute the third largest ethnic group after Serbs and Hungarians. Like other ethnic Slovaks, they speak the Slovak language, but most of them are Protestant (Evangelical-Augsburg Church, a Lutheran Protestant denomination) by faith and not Roman Catholic, unlike most Slovaks in Slovakia.

Demographics

Most Slovaks live in Kovačica (8,497 Slovaks) and Bački Petrovac (5,773 Slovaks). There are two municipalities in Vojvodina with absolute or relative Slovak majorities: Bački Petrovac (with 66.4% Slovaks) and Kovačica (with 41% Slovaks). The towns of Kovačica and Bački Petrovac are the cultural centres of Slovaks in Vojvodina. Slovak is one of the six official languages of the provincial administration in Vojvodina.

The settlements in Vojvodina with absolute or relative Slovak majority are:
 Bački Petrovac (Bački Petrovac municipality)
 Kulpin (Bački Petrovac municipality)
 Gložan (Bački Petrovac municipality)
 Kisač (Novi Sad municipality)
 Pivnice (Bačka Palanka municipality)
 Lalić (Odžaci municipality)
 Selenča (Bač municipality)
 Lug (Beočin municipality)
 Ljuba (Šid municipality)
 Kovačica (Kovačica municipality)
 Padina (Kovačica municipality)
 Belo Blato (Zrenjanin municipality)
 Hajdučica (Plandište municipality)
 Janošik (Alibunar municipality)
 Slankamenački Vinogradi (Inđija municipality)

History
 
 

The modern Slovaks in Vojvodina are descendants of 18th- and 19th-century settlers, who migrated from the territory of present-day Slovakia. First Slovak settlers from area around Tatra migrated to Bačka during the time of Karlo I; in 1720 Slovaks settled in Bajša, in 1740 in Petrovac and Futog, and in 1742 (during the time of Maria Theresa) in Bezdan. Some of them also later moved to Srem. In 1760, 120 Slovak families were settled in Selenča, but they later moved to Stara Pazova in Srem.

In 1783, Slovaks settled in Kisač, Veprovac, Gložan, and Topola. Part of them also settled in Bajša. In 1790–1791, Slovaks settled in Pivnice, in 1792 in Stara Palanka, and in 1793 in Novi Slankamen. In 1784–1787, Slovaks settled in Slovanski Bardan. In 1792 Slovaks settled in Bačka Palanka. Some of them moved in 1788 to Aradac and Ečka, and some of them later also moved to Lalić.

In 1800, Slovaks settled in Kovačica, and in 1806 and 1809 in Padina. In 1806, one group of Slovaks settled in Čoka, and in 1809 in Šupljaja. In 1825, Slovaks settled in Dušanovac, and in 1830 in Stari Lec. In 1850, 20 Slovak families were settled in Grk. In 1868, Slovaks settled in Marienfeld, from where they later moved to Vojlovica. In the same time, some Slovaks also settled in Ivanovo. In 1887, Slovaks were settled in Elizenhajm, and in 1899 in Silađi colony near Apatin.

According to the 1880 census, Slovaks were the sixth largest ethnic group within present-day Vojvodina, and their number was 43,318. Until the end of the First World War, many of the Slovaks were Hungarized. According to the 2011 census, numbering 52,570, Slovaks are the sixth largest ethnic group in Serbia.

Notable people
 Miroslav Benka, screenwriter, director, designer and university pedagogue
 Zuzana Chalupová (Zuzana Halupova), naïve painter
 Dominik Dinga, footballer

See also
Serbia-Slovakia relations
Serbs in Slovakia

References

External sources
 Borislav Jankulov, Pregled kolonizacije Vojvodine u XVIII i XIX veku, Novi Sad - Pančevo, 2003.

External links 
 Vojvodinian Slovaks contemporary and native art 
 Ústav pre kultúru vojvodinských Slovákov | slovackizavod.org.rs 
 Matica slovenská v Srbsku 
 Hlas Ľudu weekly magazine 

Serbia
Ethnic groups in Serbia
Ethnic groups in Vojvodina
Serbian people of Slovak descent